Carol Ann Blackman (born 14 October 1947), also known as Carol Blackman or Carol Blackman Shultis, is a Bermudian equestrian. She moved to the United States in 1981 but competed internationally for Bermuda, including at the 1991 Pan American Games (winning a team silver medal) and the 1987 Pan American Games. She competed in the individual eventing at the 1988 Summer Olympics.

See also
 Bermuda at the 1988 Summer Olympics
 Bermuda at the 1991 Pan American Games

References

External links
 
 

1947 births
Living people
Bermudian female equestrians
Olympic equestrians of Bermuda
Equestrians at the 1988 Summer Olympics
Pan American Games medalists in equestrian
Pan American Games silver medalists for Bermuda
Equestrians at the 1987 Pan American Games
Equestrians at the 1991 Pan American Games
Medalists at the 1991 Pan American Games
Sportspeople from London